Beijinho  ("Little kiss" in Portuguese), also known as branquinho ("little white one"), is a typical Brazilian birthday party candy prepared with condensed milk, grated desiccated coconut, rolled over caster sugar or grated coconut and frequently topped with a clove.

Beijinho is the coconut version of the Brazilian brigadeiro. When rolled, it can be covered with granulated sugar or grated coconut. Traditionally a single clove is stuck in the top of the candy.

It is believed that Beijinho was originally called "Nun's kiss" and formerly made with almonds, water and sugar.

See also
 Brigadeiro
 Cajuzinho
 List of Brazilian dishes
 List of Brazilian sweets and desserts
 Olho-de-sogra

References 

Brazilian confectionery
Foods containing coconut